Havidán Rodríguez (born February 24, 1959, in Arecibo, Puerto Rico) is an American sociologist and university administrator.  He is currently the president of the University at Albany, SUNY. He earned his Ph.D. in sociology from the University of Wisconsin–Madison.

Education

Dr. Havidán Rodríguez earned his bachelor's degree in psychology from the University of Maryland, College Park, his master's degree in sociology from the University of Wisconsin–Milwaukee, and his Ph.D in sociology from the University of Wisconsin–Madison in 1991. His Ph.D. field of specialization was demography, an area in which he continues to publish, along with his interdisciplinary work.

Career
Rodríguez was named the 20th president of the University at Albany, SUNY by the State University of New York Board of Trustees on June 21, 2017, a position he assumed in September 2017. He is the first Latino president of a SUNY campus. Prior to this position, Rodríguez served as founding Provost and Executive Vice President for Academic Affairs at the University of Texas Rio Grande Valley, Interim President of University of Texas–Pan American, and Deputy Provost at University of Delaware. His first academic position after earning his Ph.D. was at the University of Puerto Rico at Mayagüez.

Rodríguez has been featured in The Hispanic Outlook in Higher Education, the January/February 2018 issue of Latino Leaders Magazine, The Minority Report. He was interviewed about Puerto Rico's economic crisis by El Nuevo Día in June 2018, and included as a "trailblazer" in the December 2017 American Way.

Research and scholarship

Rodríguez has published prolifically in the social science aspects of disasters (including the vulnerability and resiliency to disasters), and socioeconomic well-being among minorities, particularly Latinos/as, in the United States (including the migration, education, and socioeconomic mobility among Puerto Ricans in Puerto Rico and the Contiguous United States). He has led and participated in a number of field research projects, including trips to Honduras, following Hurricane Mitch, India and Sri Lanka following the 2004 Indian Ocean earthquake and tsunami, and the Gulf Coast following Hurricane Katrina. He has received funding from the National Science Foundation, the Ford Foundation, and the Federal Emergency Management Agency.

In addition to numerous journal articles and book chapters, Rodríguez is co-author (with Marie T. Mora and Alberto Dávila) of Population, Migration, and Socioeconomic Outcomes among Island and Mainland Puerto Ricans: La Crisis Boricua (Lexington Books, November 2017). He is also the co-editor of Handbook of Disaster Research (with Quarantelli and Dynes, Springer, 2006); Handbook of Disaster Research, 2nd Edition (with Trainor and Donner, Springer, 2018); and Latinas/os in the United States: Changing the Face of América (with Rogelio Sáenz and Menjívar, Springer, 2008).

Honors and awards

 Man of the Year, New York League of Puerto Rican Women, 2018
 Omicron Delta Kappa honoris causa initiate, University at Albany, 2017
Top Latino Leader, National Diversity Council's Council for Latino Workplace Equity, 2017
 Inspiring Leaders in STEM Award, INSIGHT into Diversity magazine, 2017
 President's Medallion, University of Texas Rio Grande Valley, 2017
 Cesar Estrada Chavez Award, American Association for Access, Equity, and Diversity (AAAED), 2016
 Highlighted in Bright Spots in Hispanic Education on-line catalogue, September 2015, White House Initiative on Educational Excellence for Hispanics
 Alfredo de los Santos, Jr., Award for Distinguished Leadership in Higher Education, American Association for Hispanics in Higher Education (AAHHE), 2015
 Cover Story, Hispanic Outlook in Higher Education, June 2015
 Scholar of the Year, El Sol: Latino Newspaper, Philadelphia, July 19, 2008
 Hispanic of the Year: Professional Achievement Award, Latin American Community Center, Delaware, 2007
 Federal Emergency Management Agency (FEMA), National Disaster Medical System (NDMS) Outstanding Achievement Award for 2004
 Frey Foundation Distinguished Visiting Professor, University of North Carolina–Chapel Hill, (Spring 2002)

References

External links
President, University at Albany SUNY website

 

American sociologists
1959 births
Living people
People from Arecibo, Puerto Rico
Presidents of University at Albany
University of Delaware faculty
University of Wisconsin–Madison College of Letters and Science alumni
University of Wisconsin–Milwaukee alumni
University of Maryland, College Park alumni
University of Texas–Pan American people
University of Texas Rio Grande Valley people
University of Puerto Rico faculty
University of Texas System people